James J Busuttil (New York City, July 28, 1957) is a lawyer, former professor, and author. He was also a member of the Permanent Court of Arbitration, The Hague and a legal publisher.

Education
Busuttil studied at the University of Oxford where he obtained the degree of Doctor of Philosophy in Public International Law in 1996 with a dissertation called ‘Naval Weapons Systems and the Contemporary Law of War: Selected Topics’ for which he was awarded the 1996 Dasturzada Dr Jal Pavry Memorial Prize for best Doctoral or Masters thesis in Law, Modern History or Social Studies on a subject in the area of international peace and understanding. His supervisor was Sir Ian Brownlie, CBE, QC, FBA, Chichele Professor of Public International Law, All Souls College. During his time at Oxford, Busuttil was Member of the Governing Body of Linacre College (1990–91). Domus Scholar of Linacre College (1991–92), Member of the Standing Committee, Oxford University Strategic Studies Group (1991–95) and Member of Halifax House (1990–96) as well as President of Linacre College Common Room (1991). He is a Life Member of the Oxford Union Society.
   
He also studied at New York University School of Law where he obtained a Juris Doctor cum laude in June 1982 and the following honours: Order of the Coif (highest US national post-graduate law award)  Clyde W. Eagleton Graduate Award in International Law  Moot Court Advocacy Award  Projects Editor, NYU Journal of International Law and Politics Legal Research Intern, United Nations Institute for Training and Research (UNITAR), United Nations Headquarters (1981–82).

Prior to that he studied at Harvard University where he was conferred the degree of Bachelor of Arts cum laude in June 1979 his field of Concentration being Government (International Relations). He obtained the following honours: Harvard College Scholarship  Dean's List, every semester  New York State Regents Scholarship  New York State Governor's Citation.

Teaching career

Busuttil taught at the Faculty of Laws, University College London (UCL), and School of Law, Queen Mary University of London (QMUL)from January 2004 to January 2015.

He was Director of the University of London Master of Laws (LLM) Programme for International students. He led and was responsible for the setting up, development, delivery and management of the LLM degree.

He was appointed Honorary Professor at the Department of Law, Middlesex University London, in May 2004 and Honorary Visiting Professor at the Faculty of Law, University College London UCL London, from January 2004 to January 2015.   
  
He taught at the Institute of Social Studies The Hague from April 1998 to December 2003 and was Associate Professor of International Law and Organisation as well as Co-Director, LLM in International Law and Organisation; Chair, Human Rights Working Group.

He was a research fellow at the School of Law, King's College London, London from June 1995 to April 1998 in International Human Rights Law.

Professional organizations
Busuttil is a member of the District of Columbia Bar Institute of Directors (Life Fellow), Royal Society for the Encouragement of the Arts, Manufactures and Commerce (Life Fellow) and the Royal Geographical Society (Life Fellow) and the Royal Society for Asian Affairs Explorers Club (Life Fellow).

Public service positions

Busuttil has occupied the following positions: 
Governor, British Institute of Human Rights (1998–2004, Member of Executive Committee 1998–99) 
Member, Pugwash Conference on Science and World Affairs, Netherlands Branch (1999–2004) 
Member, Council on Foreign Relations (1990–95) 
Executive Council, American Society of International Law (1988–91) 
Member, St. John's University (New York) Council (1986–1996) 
Editor-in-Chief, The Hague Legal Capital web portal (2001–2003) 
Co-Rapporteur, Committee on Islamic Law and International Law, International Law Association (2003–2005, Member 2001–2005) 
Rapporteur, Helsinki Watch's Committee of Jurists (1988–90) 
Rapporteur, Independent Counsel on International Human Rights (1986–87) 
Member, Advisory Board University of Sarajevo 
Human Rights Centre (1998 to present) 
Member, Advisory Group Centre for Rural Childhood, Perth College UHI (2010–2014) 
Advisor, International League for Human Rights (1992–95) 
International Law Adviser, Association of Afghan Lawyers (Kabul) (1987–1995) 
Member, Policy Sciences Institute, Yale University (1987–90) 
Vice Chair, Committee on International Human Rights, New York State Bar Association (1988–89) 
Member, Committee on International Human Rights, Association of the Bar of the City of New York (1989–91) 
Member, Committee on Extradition and Human Rights, International Law Association, American Branch (1992–2005) 
Member, Human Rights Interest Group, American Society of International Law (1991–2005) 
Member, Committee on Maritime Neutrality, International Law Association, American Branch (1992–2005) 
Member, Discussion Group on the Laws of Armed Conflict, British Institute of International and Comparative Law (1990–2006) 
Member, Committee on Islamic Law and International Law, International Law Association, American Branch (1995–2005) 
Vice Chair, Inter-Bar Committee on Terrorism, American Bar Association (1984–86) 
Member, Terrorism Committee, International Law Association, American Branch (1984–91) 
Member, International Criminal Law Committee, American Bar Association (1984–90) 
Member, Multinational Banking Committee, International Law Association, American Branch (1988–90) 
Member, International Banking and Finance Committee, American Bar Association (1986–90) 
Member, Commercial Financial Services Committee, American Bar Association (1988–90) 
Member, Environmental Controls Committee, American Bar Association (1988–90) 
Member, US Government International Whaling Commission Interagency Committee (1986–2008) 
National Administrator, United Kingdom National Competition, Philip C. Jessup International Law Moot Court Competition (1993–95) 
Judge, Philip C. Jessup International Law Moot Court Competition (1983–93, 1996–99)

Honors
Busuttil received the American Bar Association (1988) Distinguished Recent Graduate Award from the New York University School of Law (1987).

US Bar admissions
Busuttil was admitted to the following: 
New York Bar in 1983 
Southern District of New York, Eastern District of New York, District of Columbia Circuit Court of Appeals, District of Columbia, 1984
Ninth Circuit Court of Appeals, Fourth Circuit Court of Appeals, Seventh Circuit Court of Appeals in 1985
Fifth Circuit Court of Appeals, Court of International Trade, 1986
First Circuit Court of Appeals, 1987
Sixth Circuit Court of Appeals, 1988
Eleventh Circuit Court of Appeals, Court of Appeals for the Federal Circuit, 2000
US Court of Appeals for the Armed Forces, US Court of Appeals for Veterans Claims, US Tax Court, 2002.

Publications
James Busuttil has written the following books:

 Naval Weapons Systems and the Contemporary Law of War (Clarendon Press: Oxford 1998, xxi + 249)   
Towards the Rule of Law: Soviet Legal Reform and Human Rights Under Perestroika (Helsinki Watch: New York 1989, v + 180)

He has edited the following books:
Bridge or Barrier: Religion, Violence and Visions for Peace (Gerrie ter Haar& James J. Busuttil eds, Brill: Leiden & Boston 2005, xi + 392)
The Freedom to Do God's Will: Religious Fundamentalism and Social Change (Gerrie ter Haar& James J. Busuttil eds, Routledge: London, September 2002, xiii + 254)
Human Rights for the 21st Century (Robert Blackburn & James J. Busuttil eds, Mansell: London 1997, viii + 168)
Sourcebook on Environmental Law (James J. Busuttil, Geoff Gilbert & Maurice Sunkin eds, Cavendish: London 1994, 650)

He has written the following chapters in these edited works:   
"Policy Responses to Religious Fundamentalism", in The Freedom to Do God's Will: Religious Fundamentalism and Social Change 230-37 (Gerrie ter Haar& James J. Busuttil eds, Routledge: London, September 2002)
"A Taste of Armageddon: The Law of Armed Conflict as Applied to Cyberwar", in The Reality of International Law 37-56 (Guy S. Goodwin-Gill & Stefan Talmon eds, Clarendon Press: Oxford, September 1999)
"International Humanitarian Law: The Case of Naval Mines", in Human Rights for the 21st Century 110-32 (Robert Blackburn & James J. Busuttil eds, Mansell: London 1997)

He has authored the following papers:
"The Legal Regulation of Naval Mines: Present and Future" (University of Essex Human Rights Centre Papers in the Theory & Practice of Human Rights No. 13 (June 1995) (39 A4 pages))
"Gli Obblighi di Gestione degli Amministratori di S.P.A." [Managerial Obligations of the Administrators of Public Companies], (1994) 13 Le Società 1005-09 (No. 7, July 1994) (LCCN 84641993)
"Limiti all’Esercizio del Diritto di Voto dell’Azionista" [Limitation on the Exercise of the Voting Right of a Shareholder], 13 Le Società 136-38 (No. 1, Jan. 1994) (LCCN 84641993)
"War Crimes and Misdemeanors", 1 Crosslines Global Report 10-12 (No. 4, Sept. 1993)   
"‘Slay Them Wherever You Find Them’: Humanitarian Law in Islam", 30 Military Law and Law of War Review 111-45 (No. 1-4, 1991) (ISSN 0556-7394)
"Uganda at the Crossroads: Current Human Rights Conditions" (with Robin L. Dahlberg, Sheldon J. Oliensis and Sidney S. Rosdeithcher), 46 The Record 598–673 (No. 6, Oct. 1991) (ISSN 0004-5837)
"The Bonn Declaration on International Terrorism: A Non-Binding International Agreement on Aircraft Hijacking, 31 International and Comparative Law Quarterly" 474-87 (July 1982) (ISSN 0020-5893)

Permanent court of arbitration
Busuttil is one of Malta's four representatives on the Permanent Court of Arbitration at The Hague. He was appointed in 2007 but his appointment was not renewed.

References

1957 births
Living people
Fellows of the Royal Geographical Society
Harvard University alumni
New York University School of Law alumni